Nazil (also Romanized as Nāzīl; also known as Nārīl) is a village in Nazil Rural District, Nukabad District, Khash County, Sistan and Baluchestan Province, Iran. At the 2006 census, its population was 591, in 205 families.

References 

Populated places in Khash County